Sainte-Anne-de-Bellevue is an on-island suburb located at the western tip of the Island of Montreal in southwestern Quebec, Canada. It is the second oldest community in Montreal's West Island, having been founded as a parish in 1703. The oldest, Dorval, was founded in 1667.

Points of interest include the Sainte-Anne-de-Bellevue Canal (a National Historic Site of Canada), the Sainte-Anne Veterans' Hospital, the Morgan Arboretum, and the L'Anse-à-l'Orme Nature Park.

History

Sainte-Anne-de-Bellevue was established on a location once known and frequented by both the Algonquin and Iroquois peoples. Situated between two important lakes (Lac des Deux-Montagnes and Lac Saint Louis) and near the confluence of two important rivers (the Saint Lawrence River and the Ottawa River) both nations recognized its natural strategic advantages and had names for the place. The oral records show that it was named “Tiotenactokte” by the Algonquin, which means "place of the last encampments" and that the Iroquois called it “Skanawetsy” meaning "white waters, after the rapids".

In 1663, the Saint-Louis Mission was founded in the west end of Montreal Island at Pointe-Caron (site of the present-day Baie-d'Urfé yacht club), and was led by François-Saturnin Lascaris d'Urfé. At that time, the mission included the entire area from the tip of Montreal Island to Pointe-Claire, Île Perrot, Soulanges, Vaudreuil, and Île aux Tourtes.

In 1672, King Louis XIV of France granted fiefdoms bordering on Lake of Two Mountains and Lake Saint-Louis to Louis de Berthé, Lord of Chailly, and to his brother Gabriel, Lord of La Joubardière. One of these adjacent fiefdoms was called Bellevue, due to its good views to the east and west. In 1677, the Parish of Saint-Louis-du-Bout-de-l'Île, sometimes also called Saint-Louis-du-Haut-de-l'Île, was founded. Jean de Lalonde was the first church warden. One September 30, 1687, Lalonde and four other parishioners were killed in a skirmish with the Iroquois. In 1703, the parish was closed and its registers moved to Lachine because of the constant threat from the Iroquois.

Around 1712, René-Charles de Breslay (1658–1735), local parish priest from 1703 to 1719, got caught in a fierce snowstorm. He fell from his horse, broke his leg on the ice, and lost the horse. Breslay was allegedly saved through the intervention by Saint Anne, after which he built a chapel dedicated to her at the westernmost point of Montreal Island next to Fort Senneville and Tourtes Island (Île aux Tourtes). Two years later, the parish was reestablished and took the name Sainte-Anne-du-Bout-de-l'Île.

From the early 1800s the town became a place of literary pilgrimage after Thomas Moore the famous Irish composer wrote one of his most celebrated works Canadian Boat Song here.

In 1835, the local post office opened. In 1843, the Sainte-Anne Canal was completed, resulting in a large number of travellers and merchants passing through the village. Another impetus to its development came a few years later in 1854, when the Grand Trunk Railway was built through the area, followed by the Canadian Pacific Railway in 1887.

In 1845, the place was first incorporated as the Municipality of Bout-de-l'Isle. This was abolished two years later, but in 1855, it was reestablished as the Parish Municipality of Sainte-Anne-en-l'Isle-de-Montréal. In 1878, the main settlement was incorporated as a separate village municipality, and the parish municipality was renamed to Sainte-Anne-de-Bellevue that same year. The village municipality changed its status to town (ville) on January 12, 1895.

The early 20th century saw several developments in Sainte-Anne-de-Bellevue: the Macdonald College (affiliated to the McGill University) was established in 1907; the Federal Government built Ste. Anne's Veteran Hospital in 1917; the Galipeault Bridge was built in 1924 and doubled in 1964, linking Sainte-Anne-de-Bellevue with Île Perrot. One of Canada's earliest Garden City experiments was undertaken in Sainte-Anne-de-Bellevue by John James Harpell, an industrialist, who around 1918 developed the  neighbourhood of Gardenvale. The neighbourhood was granted its own post office in 1920.

In 1911, the parish municipality lost part of its territory when Baie-d'Urfé became a separate municipality. In 1964, the town of Sainte-Anne-de-Bellevue annexed the parish municipality.

On January 1, 2002, as part of the 2002–2006 municipal reorganization of Montreal, Sainte-Anne-de-Bellevue was merged into the city of Montreal and became part of the borough of L'Île-Bizard–Sainte-Geneviève–Sainte-Anne-de-Bellevue.  However, after a change of government and a 2004 referendum, it was re-constituted as an independent city on January 1, 2006.

Climate

Demographics 

Local government

The current mayor of Saint-Anne-de-Bellevue is Paola Hawa.

There are six city councilors:
Ryan Young (District 1)
Jean-Pierre Cardinal (District 2)
Dan Boyer (District 3)
Tom Broad (District 4)
Yvan Labelle (District 5)
Denis Gignac (District 6)

List of mayors 
The mayors of Sainte-Anne-de-Bellevue have been:

 Jules Tremblay, 1878–1879
 Thomas Grenier, 1880–1884, 1885–1886
 Antoine St-Denis, 1881–1883
 D. Lebeau, 1887
 L. Michaud, 1888–1897
 M. C. Bezner, 1898–1899, 1901–1905, 1909–10, 1915–1916
 L.N.F. Cypihot, 1900, 1921–1922
 J.A. Aumais, 1906
 Guis. Daoust, 1906, 1917–1920
 Bruno Lalonde, 1907–1908, 1913–1914
 J.S. Vallée, 1911–1912
 L.J. Boileau, 1923–1931, 1933–1934
 A.R. Demers, 1932, 1935–1938
 E.E. Deslauriers, 1939–1951
 Philippe Godin, 1951–1965
 J.L. Paquin, 1965–1973
 Alphonse Trudeau, 1973–1978
 Marcel Marleau, 1978–1984
 René Martin, 1984–1994
 Bill Tierney, 1994–2001, 2005–2009
 Francis Deroo, 2009–2013
 Paola Hawa, 2013–present

Transportation

Sainte-Anne-de-Bellevue is traversed by Autoroute 40 (the Trans-Canada Highway) and Autoroute 20, which crosses the Ottawa River over the Galipeault Bridge linking it to Île Perrot.

For public transit, the town is served by the Sainte-Anne-de-Bellevue commuter train station on the Vaudreuil-Hudson Line. It also covered by the bus network of the Société de transport de Montréal.

It is planned that Sainte-Anne-de-Bellevue would be the westernmost terminus for the newly planned Réseau express métropolitain rapid transit system on the island of Montreal.

Education
The Centre de services scolaire Marguerite-Bourgeoys operates Francophone public schools, but were previously operated by the Commission scolaire Marguerite-Bourgeoys until June 15, 2020. The change was a result of a law passed by the Quebec government that changed the school board system from denominational to linguistic. It operates the École primaire du Bout-de-l'Isle.

The Lester B. Pearson School Board (LBPSB) operates Anglophone public schools in the area. It operates Macdonald High School.

The zoned elementary school is Dorset Elementary School in Baie-D'Urfé

See also
 Ecomuseum Zoo
 List of former boroughs
 Montreal Merger
 Morgan Arboretum
 Municipal reorganization in Quebec

References

External links

 Official website
 Ecomuseum
 Parks Canada – Sante-Anne-de-Bellevue locks
 Ste-Anne-de-Bellevue Rugby Club
 Nursing Services

 
Cities and towns in Quebec
Populated places established in 1703
1703 establishments in the French colonial empire
Island of Montreal municipalities